In enzymology, a D-threo-aldose 1-dehydrogenase is an enzyme that catalyzes the chemical reaction

a D-threo-aldose + NAD+  a D-threo-aldono-1,5-lactone + NADH + H+

Thus, the two substrates of this enzyme are D-threo-aldose and NAD+, whereas its 3 products are D-threo-aldono-1,5-lactone, NADH, and H+.

This enzyme belongs to the family of oxidoreductases, specifically those acting on the CH-OH group of donor with NAD+ or NADP+ as acceptor.  The systematic name of this enzyme class is D-threo-aldose:NAD+ 1-oxidoreductase. Other names in common use include L-fucose dehydrogenase, (2S,3R)-aldose dehydrogenase, dehydrogenase, L-fucose, and L-fucose (D-arabinose) dehydrogenase.  This enzyme participates in ascorbate and aldarate metabolism.

References

 
 

EC 1.1.1
NADH-dependent enzymes
Enzymes of unknown structure